

Group A

American Samoa
Head coach: Rupeni Luvu

Fiji
Head coach: Imdad Ali

Solomon Islands
Head coach: Luke Eroi

Vanuatu
Head coach: Richard Iwai

Group B

New Zealand
Head coach:  Neil Emblen

Papua New Guinea
Head coach:  Frank Farina

Tonga
Head coach: Timote Moleni

External links
 Official OFC website
 Official OFC competition schedule
 Team List

Squads